James Jason Mecir (born May 16, 1970) is an American former Major League Baseball pitcher who played for five teams over an 11-year career between  and .

Mecir is notable for having overcome a club feet to become an effective Major League pitcher, as well as for regularly throwing a screwball. He spent  years as a member of the Oakland Athletics and is prominently mentioned in Michael Lewis's bestselling book Moneyball: The Art of Winning an Unfair Game.

Career
Mecir attended Eckerd College, and in 1990 he played collegiate summer baseball with the Falmouth Commodores of the Cape Cod Baseball League. He was selected by the Seattle Mariners in the third round of the 1991 amateur draft. He announced his retirement on October 2, 2005, following the Marlins' last game of the season.

Mecir was inducted into the Suffolk Sports Hall of Fame on Long Island, New York, in the Baseball Category with the Class of 2011.

Adversity
In , Mecir received the Tony Conigliaro Award, given annually to the player who most effectively overcomes adversity to succeed in baseball. Mecir was born with two club feet; despite several childhood surgeries that enabled him to walk, he was left with a right leg that was one inch shorter than his left leg and a right calf that was only half the size of his left calf.

Mecir was inadvertently the subject of attention which began on May 15, 2005. On that Sunday, Mecir pitched poorly in a game against the Padres, and ESPN analyst John Kruk cited Mecir's limp (not knowing about his birth defect) when Mecir walked to the mound. Kruk presented this as evidence that the Marlins were negligent for asking Mecir to pitch (while Mecir appeared to be injured). Kruk came under heavy public criticism for being insensitive, even though Kruk was unaware. However, Mecir did not take offense when informed of the remark.

References

External links

1970 births
Living people
Seattle Mariners players
New York Yankees players
Tampa Bay Devil Rays players
Oakland Athletics players
Florida Marlins players
Eckerd Tritons baseball players
Falmouth Commodores players
Baseball players from New York (state)
Major League Baseball pitchers
San Bernardino Spirit players
Riverside Pilots players
Jacksonville Suns players
Tacoma Rainiers players
Columbus Clippers players
Sacramento River Cats players
Screwball pitchers